The Bonaire Lawn Tennis Association,abbreviated BLTB, is the governing body of tennis in Bonaire. Before Bonaire became a special municipality of the Netherlands after the dissolution of the Netherlands Antilles, it was represented by the Netherlands Antilles Tennis Federation. In 2011, it decided to file for membership of the International Tennis Federation rather than to be part of the Royal Dutch Lawn Tennis Association of the Netherlands. Membership was approved in 2011 at the Annual General Meeting in Bangkok together with the Curaçao Lawn Tennis Association.

See also
Royal Dutch Lawn Tennis Association
Netherlands Antilles Tennis Federation

References

External links
Official website (not active)

National members of the Central American & Caribbean Tennis Confederation
Tennis in the Netherlands